In mathematics, the Bessel polynomials are an orthogonal sequence of polynomials. There are a number of different but closely related definitions. The definition favored by mathematicians is given by the series

Another definition, favored by electrical engineers, is sometimes known as the reverse Bessel polynomials

The coefficients of the second definition are the same as the first but in reverse order. For example, the third-degree Bessel polynomial is

while the third-degree reverse Bessel polynomial is

The reverse Bessel polynomial is used in the design of Bessel electronic filters.

Properties

Definition in terms of Bessel functions 

The Bessel polynomial may also be defined using Bessel functions from which the polynomial draws its name.

where Kn(x) is a modified Bessel function of the second kind, yn(x) is the ordinary polynomial, and θn(x) is the reverse polynomial . For example:

Definition as a hypergeometric function 

The Bessel polynomial may also be defined as a confluent hypergeometric function

A similar expression holds true for the generalized Bessel polynomials (see below):

The reverse Bessel polynomial may be defined as a generalized Laguerre polynomial:

from which it follows that it may also be defined as a hypergeometric function:

where (−2n)n is the Pochhammer symbol (rising factorial).

Generating function
The Bessel polynomials, with index shifted, have the generating function

Similar generating function exists for the  polynomials as well:

Upon setting , one has the following representation for the exponential function:

Recursion 

The Bessel polynomial may also be defined by a recursion formula:

and

Differential equation 

The Bessel polynomial obeys the following differential equation:

and

Orthogonality 

The Bessel polynomials are orthogonal with respect to the weight  integrated over the unit circle of the complex plane. In other words, if ,

Generalization

Explicit Form
A generalization of the Bessel polynomials have been suggested in literature, as following:

the corresponding reverse polynomials are

The explicit coefficients of the  polynomials are:

Consequently, the  polynomials can explicitly be written as follows:

For the weighting function

they are orthogonal, for the relation

holds for m ≠ n and c a curve surrounding the 0 point.

They specialize to the Bessel polynomials for α = β = 2, in which situation ρ(x) = exp(−2 / x).

Rodrigues formula for Bessel polynomials
The Rodrigues formula for the Bessel polynomials as particular solutions of the above differential equation is :

where a are normalization coefficients.

Associated Bessel polynomials

According to this generalization we have the following generalized differential equation for associated Bessel polynomials:

where . The solutions are,

Zeros

and

for all . Moreover, all these zeros have negative real part.

Sharper results can be said if one resorts to more powerful theorems regarding the estimates of zeros of polynomials (more concretely, the Parabola Theorem of Saff and Varga, or differential equations techniques).
One result is the following:

Particular values 

No Bessel polynomial can be factored into lower degree polynomials with rational coefficients.
The reverse Bessel polynomials are obtained by reversing the coefficients.
Equivalently, .
This results in the following:

See also
Bessel function
Neumann polynomial
Lommel polynomial
Hankel transform
Fourier–Bessel series

References

External links
 
 

Orthogonal polynomials
Special hypergeometric functions